Richard Derr (June 15, 1917 – May 8, 1992) was an American actor who worked on stage, screen, and television, performing in both starring and supporting roles.

Early years
Born in Norristown, Pennsylvania, Derr graduated from Norristown High School in 1933. While he worked as a bank clerk, he acted with a little theater group in Norristown.

Stage
A life member of The Actors Studio, Derr landed the majority of his leading roles on stage. In 1955, he sang in the lead role in the Broadway musical Plain and Fancy. His other Broadway credits include Dial M for Murder (1952), Invitation to a March (1960), Maybe Tuesday (1957), A Phoenix Too Frequent (1949), and The Closing Door (1949).

Film
On the silver screen, Derr was primarily a character actor. He had a starring role in George Pal's 1951  science fiction film from Paramount Pictures, When Worlds Collide. Derr later starred in the Invisible Avenger (1958), a film based on the radio show and pulp magazine character The Shadow. The character also served as the basis for two television pilot episodes, neither of which was developed into a series.

Television
In the 1950s, most of Derr's work was done on television. On November 21, 1950, he co-starred in "The Perfect Type" on Armstrong Circle Theatre. In 1959, he was the host of Fanfare, a summer dramatic anthology series on NBC-TV.

In 1965, he played the role of Dr. Dwyer in the three-part serial, "The Adventures of Gallegher," on Walt Disney's Wonderful World of Color, and later made appearances in Barnaby Jones, in two episodes of Star Trek,  and in the 1976 miniseries Rich Man, Poor Man Book II.

Military service
Derr served in the Army Transport Service for three years during World War II.

Real estate
Derr had a license as a real estate broker. He was an associate of the Beverly Hills Realty Company and a member of the Beverly Hills Realty Board.

Death
On May 8, 1992, at the age of 75, Derr died of pancreatic cancer in Santa Monica, California.

Partial filmography
Charlie Chan in Rio (1941) as Ken Reynolds
Man at Large (1941) as Max, posing as Colonel Von Rohn
A Gentleman at Heart (1942) as Stewart Haines
Sex Hygiene (1942 short) as Soldier
Castle in the Desert (1942) as Carl Detheridge
The Man Who Wouldn't Die (1942) as Roger Blake
Ten Gentlemen from West Point (1942) as Chester
Just Off Broadway (1942) as John Logan
Commandos Strike at Dawn (1942) as Gunnar Korstad
Tonight We Raid Calais (1943) as German Captain (uncredited)
Cry "Havoc" (1943) as Marine with Thermometer (uncredited)
An American Romance (1944) in an undetermined role (uncredited)
The Secret Heart (1946) as Larry Addams
The Bride Goes Wild (1948) as Bruce Kope Johnson
Luxury Liner (1948) as Charles G.K. Worton
Joan of Arc  (1948) as Jean de Metz (a knight)
Guilty of Treason (1950) as Soviet Col. Aleksandr Melnikov
When Worlds Collide  (1951) as David Randall
Something to Live For (1952) as Tony Collins
Invisible Avenger (1958) as Lamont Cranston
Terror Is a Man (1959) as William Fitzgerald
An American Dream (1966) as Jack Hale (uncredited)
Rosie! (1967) as Lawyer
Three in the Attic (1968) as Mr. Clinton
Topaz (1969) as U.S. Embassy Official in Copenhagen (uncredited)
Adam at 6 A.M. (1970) as Mr. Gaines
The Morning After (1974) as Dr. Tillman
The Drowning Pool  (1975) as James Devereaux
SST: Death Flight (1977) as Governor Stensky
American Gigolo (1980) as Mr. Williams
Firefox (1982) as Admiral Curtin

References

External links

Richard Derr biography
Richard Derr biography at Ellery Queen a website on deduction

1917 births
1992 deaths
20th-century American male actors
American male television actors
American male film actors
Deaths from cancer in California
Deaths from pancreatic cancer
Male actors from Pennsylvania
People from Norristown, Pennsylvania
United States Army personnel of World War II